The City of Gladstone is a former local government area in central Queensland, Australia.  It covered the urban locality of Gladstone and parts of the surrounding area.

History
Following the report of the Local Government Reform Commission released in July 2007, three former local government areas:
 City of Gladstone
 Shire of Calliope
 Shire of Miriam Vale
were amalgamated to form Gladstone Region on 15 March 2008.

Towns and localities

Economy
Being a port city, its local commerce is primarily industrial-based and include large-scale industrial plants include alumina refineries, aluminium smelting, heavy chemicals and shale oil.

Facilities

Hospital
Gladstone does contain a hospital, providing a range of facilities including: Emergency, Outpatients, General Medicine and Surgery (including Day Surgery), basic Orthopaedics, Obstetrics and Gynaecology, Medical Imaging, Pharmacy, Pathology, Central Sterilising.

Art gallery
Gladstone has an art gallery run and owned by the Gladstone Regional Council.

Airport
Gladstone Regional Council has an airport.  The Council took control of the assets of the Gladstone Airport which was previously operated by the Gladstone Calliope Aerodrome Board. This Board was a statutory body made up of representatives of the City of Gladstone and Shire of Calliope. It is currently being refurbished and provides both indirect and direct flights only to Brisbane Airport. These services are provided by Qantas Link and Strategic Airlines (as of April 2011).

Mayors
 1881: Walter Benjamin Prizeman 
 1904: Walter James Prizeman 
 1913: Walter James Prizeman (2nd time) 
 1914: Walter James Prizeman (3rd time) 
 1916: Walter James Prizeman (4th time) 
 1917: John Henry Kessell 
 1918: John Henry Kessell (2nd time) 
 1925 Edward Matthew Breslin 
 1927: Edward Matthew Breslin 
 1929–1930: W.H Ferris 
 1933–1941 : Edward Matthew Breslin 
 1941: Gideon George Dennis 
 Thomas de Lacey Kellett (several terms prior to 1944), son of William Kellett
 1946–1961 : John Francis (Jack) O'Malley 
 1979–1994 : Colin Brown

See also
 Gladstone, Queensland

References

External links
 Queensland Department of Local Government & Planning – Local Government Directory.
  – Queensland Government: Queensland Health 2010

Former local government areas of Queensland
Gladstone, Queensland
2008 disestablishments in Australia
Populated places disestablished in 2008